The 3rd constituency of Charente-Maritime (French: Troisième circonscription de la Charente-Maritime) is one of five electoral districts in the department of Charente-Maritime, each of which returns one deputy to the French National Assembly in elections using the two-round system, with a run-off if no candidate receives more than 50% of the vote in the first round.

Description
The constituency is made up of 10 whole (pre-2105) cantons – those of Aulnay, Burie, Loulay, Matha, Saintes-Nord, Saintes-Ouest, Saint-Hilaire-de-Villefranche, Saint-Jean-d'Angély, Saint-Savinien, and Tonnay-Boutonne – plus the major part of the canton of Saintes-Est (all communes except those of Colombiers and La Jard).

At the time of the 1999 census (which was the basis for the most recent redrawing of constituency boundaries, carried out in 2010) the 3rd constituency had a total population of 100,186.

Deputies

Election results

2022

 
 
 
 
 
 
 
 
|-
| colspan="8" bgcolor="#E9E9E9"|
|-

2017

2012

|- style="background-color:#E9E9E9;text-align:center;"
! colspan="2" rowspan="2" style="text-align:left;" | Candidate
! rowspan="2" colspan="2" style="text-align:left;" | Party
! colspan="2" | 1st round
! colspan="2" | 2nd round
|- style="background-color:#E9E9E9;text-align:center;"
! width="75" | Votes
! width="30" | %
! width="75" | Votes
! width="30" | %
|-
| style="background-color:" |
| style="text-align:left;" | Catherine Quere
| style="text-align:left;" | Socialist Party
| PS
| 
| 43.96%
| 
| 59.12%
|-
| style="background-color:" |
| style="text-align:left;" | Frédéric Neveu
| style="text-align:left;" | Union for a Popular Movement
| UMP
| 
| 28.75%
| 
| 40.88%
|-
| style="background-color:" |
| style="text-align:left;" | Agnès Kliewer
| style="text-align:left;" | Front National
| FN
| 
| 11.73%
| colspan="2" style="text-align:left;" |
|-
| style="background-color:" |
| style="text-align:left;" | Michelle Carmouse
| style="text-align:left;" | Left Front
| FG
| 
| 5.52%
| colspan="2" style="text-align:left;" |
|-
| style="background-color:" |
| style="text-align:left;" | Stéphane Trifiletti
| style="text-align:left;" | Europe Ecology – The Greens
| EELV
| 
| 3.51%
| colspan="2" style="text-align:left;" |
|-
| style="background-color:" |
| style="text-align:left;" | Pierre Maudoux
| style="text-align:left;" | Centrist
| CEN
| 
| 2.31%
| colspan="2" style="text-align:left;" |
|-
| style="background-color:" |
| style="text-align:left;" | Serge Maupouet
| style="text-align:left;" | Miscellaneous Left
| DVG
| 
| 1.15%
| colspan="2" style="text-align:left;" |
|-
| style="background-color:" |
| style="text-align:left;" | Esther Willer
| style="text-align:left;" | Miscellaneous Right
| DVD
| 
| 0.92%
| colspan="2" style="text-align:left;" |
|-
| style="background-color:" |
| style="text-align:left;" | Joëlle de Corte
| style="text-align:left;" | Ecologist
| ECO
| 
| 0.80%
| colspan="2" style="text-align:left;" |
|-
| style="background-color:" |
| style="text-align:left;" | Hugues Auvray
| style="text-align:left;" | Miscellaneous Right
| DVD
| 
| 0.79%
| colspan="2" style="text-align:left;" |
|-
| style="background-color:" |
| style="text-align:left;" | Alexandre Kikolski
| style="text-align:left;" | Far Left
| EXG
| 
| 0.55%
| colspan="2" style="text-align:left;" |
|-
| colspan="8" style="background-color:#E9E9E9;"|
|- style="font-weight:bold"
| colspan="4" style="text-align:left;" | Total
| 
| 100%
| 
| 100%
|-
| colspan="8" style="background-color:#E9E9E9;"|
|-
| colspan="4" style="text-align:left;" | Registered voters
| 
| style="background-color:#E9E9E9;"|
| 
| style="background-color:#E9E9E9;"|
|-
| colspan="4" style="text-align:left;" | Blank/Void ballots
| 
| 1.04%
| 
| 1.91%
|-
| colspan="4" style="text-align:left;" | Turnout
| 
| 57.82%
| 
| 56.90%
|-
| colspan="4" style="text-align:left;" | Abstentions
| 
| 42.18%
| 
| 43.10%
|-
| colspan="8" style="background-color:#E9E9E9;"|
|- style="font-weight:bold"
| colspan="6" style="text-align:left;" | Result
| colspan="2" style="background-color:" | PS HOLD
|}

2007

|- style="background-color:#E9E9E9;text-align:center;"
! colspan="2" rowspan="2" style="text-align:left;" | Candidate
! rowspan="2" colspan="2" style="text-align:left;" | Party
! colspan="2" | 1st round
! colspan="2" | 2nd round
|- style="background-color:#E9E9E9;text-align:center;"
! width="75" | Votes
! width="30" | %
! width="75" | Votes
! width="30" | %
|-
| style="background-color:" |
| style="text-align:left;" | Catherine Quere
| style="text-align:left;" | Socialist Party
| PS
| 
| 31.99%
| 
| 52.02%
|-
| style="background-color:" |
| style="text-align:left;" | Xavier de Roux
| style="text-align:left;" | Union for a Popular Movement
| UMP
| 
| 39.43%
| 
| 47.98%
|-
| style="background-color:" |
| style="text-align:left;" | Jean-Philippe Ardouin
| style="text-align:left;" | Democratic Movement
| MoDem
| 
| 9.93%
| colspan="2" style="text-align:left;" |
|-
| style="background-color:" |
| style="text-align:left;" | Philippe Barotin
| style="text-align:left;" | Hunting, Fishing, Nature, Traditions
| CPNT
| 
| 3.16%
| colspan="2" style="text-align:left;" |
|-
| style="background-color:" |
| style="text-align:left;" | Yolande Bak
| style="text-align:left;" | Front National
| FN
| 
| 3.08%
| colspan="2" style="text-align:left;" |
|-
| style="background-color:" |
| style="text-align:left;" | Michelle Carmouse
| style="text-align:left;" | Communist
| PCF
| 
| 2.90%
| colspan="2" style="text-align:left;" |
|-
| style="background-color:" |
| style="text-align:left;" | Christian Couillaud
| style="text-align:left;" | The Greens
| VEC
| 
| 2.73%
| colspan="2" style="text-align:left;" |
|-
| style="background-color:" |
| style="text-align:left;" | Nadège Edwards
| style="text-align:left;" | Far Left
| EXG
| 
| 2.66%
| colspan="2" style="text-align:left;" |
|-
| style="background-color:" |
| style="text-align:left;" | Aline Mathieu
| style="text-align:left;" | Movement for France
| MPF
| 
| 1.88%
| colspan="2" style="text-align:left;" |
|-
| style="background-color:" |
| style="text-align:left;" | David Leveque
| style="text-align:left;" | Independent
| DIV
| 
| 0.96%
| colspan="2" style="text-align:left;" |
|-
| style="background-color:" |
| style="text-align:left;" | Khamssa Rahmani
| style="text-align:left;" | Far Left
| EXG
| 
| 0.70%
| colspan="2" style="text-align:left;" |
|-
| style="background-color:" |
| style="text-align:left;" | Christine Tasin
| style="text-align:left;" | Miscellaneous Left
| DVG
| 
| 0.57%
| colspan="2" style="text-align:left;" |
|-
| colspan="8" style="background-color:#E9E9E9;"|
|- style="font-weight:bold"
| colspan="4" style="text-align:left;" | Total
| 
| 100%
| 
| 100%
|-
| colspan="8" style="background-color:#E9E9E9;"|
|-
| colspan="4" style="text-align:left;" | Registered voters
| 
| style="background-color:#E9E9E9;"|
| 
| style="background-color:#E9E9E9;"|
|-
| colspan="4" style="text-align:left;" | Blank/Void ballots
| 
| 1.94%
| 
| 3.02%
|-
| colspan="4" style="text-align:left;" | Turnout
| 
| 61.72%
| 
| 63.38%
|-
| colspan="4" style="text-align:left;" | Abstentions
| 
| 38.28%
| 
| 36.62%
|-
| colspan="8" style="background-color:#E9E9E9;"|
|- style="font-weight:bold"
| colspan="6" style="text-align:left;" | Result
| colspan="2" style="background-color:" | PS gain from UMP
|}

2002

 
 
 
 
 
 
 
 
|-
| colspan="8" bgcolor="#E9E9E9"|
|-

1997

References

Sources
 Notes and portraits of the French MPs under the Fifth Republic, French National Assembly
 2012 French legislative elections: Charente-Maritime's 3rd constituency (first round and run-off), Minister of the Interior

3